Nathuwas is a village in the Bhiwani district of the Indian state of Haryana. , the village had 492 households with a total population of 2,641 of which 1,440 were male and 1,201 female.

Nathuwas has two schools, primary school runs in a separate building and senior secondary school run in a bigger building and total 400+ students are studying here including students from nearby villages. 

In the recent developments, Nutangram Library was opened on 23 April 2017 under the aegis of Nutangram Foundation. Purpose of the Library is to emphasize and increase reading skills and student's desire to read and learn.

References

Villages in Bhiwani district